"If Looks Could Kill" is a single by Australian recording artist Timomatic, released digitally on 23 March 2012, as the second single from his self-titled second studio album. He co-wrote the song with Anthony Egizii and David Musumeci of the production duo DNA Songs, who also handled the song's production. "If Looks Could Kill" peaked at number eight on the ARIA Singles Chart and was certified double platinum by the Australian Recording Industry Association for selling 140,000 copies.

Background
Timomatic co-wrote "If Looks Could Kill" with Anthony Egizii and David Musumeci of production duo DNA Songs, who also produced the track. The song was released digitally on 23 March 2012.

Track listing
Digital download
"If Looks Could Kill" – 3:39

Charts

Weekly charts

Year-end charts

Certifications

Release history

References

2012 songs
2012 singles
Timomatic songs
Songs written by David Musumeci
Songs written by Anthony Egizii
Song recordings produced by DNA Songs
Sony Music Australia singles